QUIP or quip may refer to:

 Quip (software), a collaborative productivity software suite for mobile and the Web
 Quip (company), an American oral hygiene startup
 Quip (wit), a form of wit
 Acyl-homoserine-lactone acylase, an enzyme also known as QuiP
 Exxon Qwip, one of the first commercial fax machines
 Quad in-line package, or QUIP, an electronic device package

See also
Quipper (disambiguation)
QUIPS, quality measurement